Anolis villai, the Great Corn Island anole or country anole, is a species of lizard in the family Dactyloidae. The species is found on Great Corn Island in Nicaragua.

References

Anoles
Reptiles described in 1976
Endemic fauna of Nicaragua
Reptiles of Nicaragua
Taxa named by Orlando H. Garrido
Taxa named by Stephen Blair Hedges